Hypercompe cermelii is a moth of the subfamily Arctiinae first described by Watson in 1977. It is found in Venezuela.

The larvae have been recorded feeding on Gossypium, Plantago and Solanum species.

References

Hypercompe
Moths described in 1977